Stangl is a German surname. Notable people with the surname include:

Christian Stangl (born 1966), Austrian mountain climber
Dalene Stangl, American statistician
Ernst Stangl (fl. 1970s), Austrian luger
Franz Stangl (1908–1971), Austrian-born Nazi SS officer and commandant of the Sobibor and then Treblinka extermination camps
Johann Stangl (fl. 1950s), Austrian luger
Josef Stangl (1907–1979), Roman Catholic bishop who consecrated Pope Benedict XVI
Karl Stangl (born 1930), Austrian rower
Stefan Stangl (born 1991), Austrian footballer
Thomas Stangl (1854–1921), German classical scholar

German-language surnames
Surnames from nicknames